ICICI Prudential Life Insurance Company Limited is a life insurance company in India. Established as a joint venture between ICICI Bank Limited and Prudential Corporation Holdings Limited, ICICI Prudential Life is engaged in life insurance and asset management business. In 2016, the company became the first insurance company in India to be listed in the domestic stock exchanges.

History 
ICICI Prudential Life Insurance started its operations in 2001. The life insurance arm was established as a joint venture between ICICI Bank Limited and Prudential Corporation Holdings Limited with assets under management (AUM) of approx. .

In 2010, the company had grown up to  mark in assets under management (AUM).

In 2015, the company had crossed  mark in assets under management (AUM).

In 2016, ICICI Prudential Life became the first insurance company to be listed in Indian stock market, namely Bombay Stock Exchange and National Stock Exchange. Temasek Holdings, Premji Invest and Government of Singapore are other major shareholders of the company.

In 2017, ICICI Prudential Life was to take over Sahara Life's insurance business on request from the regulator IRDA in a motive to resolve the crisis at Sahara's life insurance arm. The merger was later revoked by Securities Appellate Tribunal.

In 2020, ICICI Prudential Life had crossed  mark in assets under management (AUM).

In 2022, ICICI Prudential Life Insurance company had crossed ₹2.5 trillion (US$30.75 billion) mark in AUM.

Milestones 
Following are the major milestones of the company after its formation:

Key people 
M S Ramachandran - chairman, independent director
 N S Kannan - managing director and chief executive officer
Judhajit Das - chief human resource officer
Amit Palta - chief distribution officer
Satyan Jambunathan - chief financial officer
Ganessan Soundiram - chief technology officer
Manish Dubey - chief marketing officer
Deepak Kinger - chief risk and compliance officer
Manish Kumar - chief investments officer
Sonali Chandak - company secretary
Souvik Jash - appointed actuary

Partnerships 

 In December 2019, the company collaborated with Paytm so that users can get the iProtect Smart plan benefits through it.
 In January 2021, the company collaborated with PhonePe so that users can get term life insurance instantly via the app without any health check-ups and paperwork.

Advertising and marketing campaigns 

 In February 2013, ICICI Prudential Life released a campaign with the theme, "Bande achhe hai". The campaign aimed to build an emotional connect for the customer by putting the simple acts of goodness of the family man as the pivot. The ad was shot by Amit Sharma of Chrome Pictures with music given by Shantanu Moitra and lyrics written by Swanand Kirkire
In March 2018, the company collaborated with actress Konkona Sen Sharma to drive awareness about their term plan ICICI Pru iProtect Smart plan that provides a life cover for family's protection and a 34 critical illness cover for self. The ad was showcased on TV, digital, cinema, outdoor media and other mediums
 During COVID-19 time, in the month of November 2020, the company released a commercial ad to spread awareness of their term plan product ICICI Pru iProtect Smart where customers can get the benefits of both life and health insurance
 In January 2023, the company associated with Indian cricketer Suryakumar Yadav. The campaign aimed at creating awareness about its product offerings which cater to the customers' diverse and evolving needs at every lifestage

Corporate Social Responsibility (CSR) initiatives 

 In March 2019, ICICI Prudential Life Insurance geared up for a CSR initiative with a campaign named "Suna Kya? Body Ka Alarm" in association with Times Spotlight. This initiative is urging Indian people to pay attention to their body signs and encourages them to be prepared financially. The company has also partnered with SRL diagnostics for discounted health check-up packages.
 In March 2020, ICICI Prudential Life Insurance partnered with Times of India for conducting the Mission Healthy India Survey 2020 to find out if people were paying attention to the signs their body gives that can help them catch the onset of a critical illness early. This awareness initiative from the company urges people to take good care of their health and be financially prepared against any uncertainty.

Awards and accreditation

See also 
 ICICI Lombard General Insurance Company Limited
List of life insurance companies in India
SBI Life Insurance Company
 HDFC Life

References

External links 

 ICICI Prudential Life Insurance (Official Website)

Life insurance companies of India
Financial services companies based in Mumbai
Financial services companies established in 2001
Indian companies established in 2001
2001 establishments in Maharashtra
Companies listed on the National Stock Exchange of India
Companies listed on the Bombay Stock Exchange